Djéniane Bourezg (Arabic: جنيان بورزاق) is a municipality in Naâma Province, Algeria. It is part of the district of Moghrar and has a population of 2,301, which gives it 11 seats in the PMA. Its postal code is 45240 and its municipal code is 4508.

Communes of Naâma Province
Naâma Province